The Galaţi Power Station is a large thermal power plant located in Galaţi, having 4 generation groups of 100 MW each and 1 unit of 135 MW having a total electricity generation capacity of 535 MW.

References

Natural gas-fired power stations in Romania